Johan Kappelhof (born 5 August 1990) is a Dutch professional footballer who plays as a defender.

Career
Kappelhof was born in Amsterdam, Netherlands. Whilst being in Ajax's youth academy for 13 years he moved from being a right winger to a defender.

At Groningen he made his debut in 2011 before helping the Green-White Armes win the KNVB Cup in 2014–15 against defending champions PEC Zwolle. It was their first major trophy and they qualified for the UEFA Europa League.
He played in all six of Groningen's Europe league group games.

Chicago Fire
On 2 February 2016, Kappelhof joined American Major League Soccer club Chicago Fire. Following the 2017 season, he was voted the club's defender of the year after earning 4 assists in 33 matches.

Following the 2021 season, Kappelhof's contract with Chicago expired and he became a free agent.

Real Salt Lake
On 18 February 2022, Kappelhof signed as a free agent with Real Salt Lake. Following the 2022 season, his contract option was declined by Salt Lake.

Personal life
Kappelhof has a Ghanaian mother and a Dutch father.

Career statistics

Club

Honours

Club
Groningen
 KNVB Cup: 2014–15

References

External links
 Voetbal International profile 
 
 
 Johan Kappelhof Interview

1990 births
Living people
Footballers from Amsterdam
Association football defenders
Dutch footballers
Netherlands under-21 international footballers
Dutch sportspeople of Ghanaian descent
FC Groningen players
Chicago Fire FC players
Real Salt Lake players
Eredivisie players
Major League Soccer players
Major League Soccer All-Stars